The mixed doubles tennis event of the 2019 Pan American Games was held from July 30 through August 3 at the Club Lawn Tennis de la Exposición in Lima, Peru.  

Alexa Guarachi and Nicolás Jarry of Chile won the gold medal, defeating Noelia Zeballos and Federico Zeballos of Bolivia in the final, 6–1, 6–3.

Anastasia Iamachkine and Sergio Galdós of Peru won the bronze medal, defeating Andrea Weedon and Wilfredo González of Guatemala in the bronze-medal match, 7–5, 6–1.

Seeds

Draw

Draw

References

External links
Draw

Mixed Doubles